Kızım Nerede? ("Where Is My Daughter?") is a Turkish suspense drama TV series that it airs on aTV from December 17, 2010 until August 3, 2011. It stars Ece Uslu, Hüseyin Avni Danyal and Burak Hakkı. It is franchised by TVN and Telemundo. It is also produced by Medya Vizyon.

Synopsis
Zafer Demiray (Hüseyin Avni Danyal) is one of the most renowned businessman in the country. He has a wife, namely Suna (Ece Uslu), and their three daughters, namely Eylül (Zeynep Kadıoğlu, Cansu (Bengü Tezcan and Zeynep (Özge Gürel). With his sisters, Ipek (Yonca Cevher Yenel) and Mine (Yağmur Kaşifoğlu), together with their respective husbands and their children combined in a one big family. Their family company that they built and established has been very successful.  
One summer morning, the family celebrated a birthday party because Zafer was chosen as the businessman of the year. He had everything that he could have imagined. After the celebration,  Zeynep and her three cousins ask permission to go to a club. The four adolescents are being dropped off by Zafer. At 3 o’clock in the morning, Suna and Ipek went there to pick them up. The party ends and Suna and Ipek found the cousins. But Zeynep was nowhere to be found! The whole family starts to wait in fear. The happy family portrait becomes a nightmare. Where is Zeynep? The series was also shown in Macedonia and because of its popularity ,the viewers asked for the last episode to be shown again

Cast

Other Characters
 Özgür Özgencer as Metin
 Inci Ültay as Hatice
 Genc Deniz as Koray

Turkish drama television series
2010 Turkish television series debuts
2011 Turkish television series endings
ATV (Turkey) original programming
Television shows set in Istanbul
Television series produced in Istanbul
Television series set in the 2010s